Montina is a brand name  of a type of flour created from milled Indian ricegrass (Achnatherum hymenoides), a type of grass native to the western United States. Indian rice grass was grown and used by Native Americans as much as 7,000 years ago. The grass is not related to rice, and the flour is gluten-free.

Indian ricegrass is grown by local farmers and processed at individually owned and dedicated gluten-free plants.  The majority of farms producing Montina in the United States use non GMOs in the growing of the ricegrass or in the  processing of Montina.

References

Flour
Cereals